The Open Città della Disfida (previously known as the Open Barletta Trofeo Dimiccoli & Borraccino) is a professional tennis tournament played on outdoor red clay courts. It is currently part of the Association of Tennis Professionals (ATP) Challenger Tour. It is held annually at the Circolo Tennis Barletta in Barletta, Italy, since 1997.

Aljaž Bedene is the singles record holder on singles titles, while Santiago Ventura and Igor Zelenay are the ones on doubles- all with three titles each.

Past finals

Singles

Doubles

External links
Official website
ITF search

 
ATP Challenger Tour
Clay court tennis tournaments
Tennis tournaments in Italy
Recurring sporting events established in 1997